The third season of Maldivian Idol premiered on 15 February 2018, on Television Maldives. Moosa Waseem continued as the show's host, while Unoosha, Ahmed Ibrahim and Ismail Affan returned as judges, joined by Zara Mujthaba who replaced Ibrahim Zaid Ali, while Shaina Shareef replaced Lamha Latheef as the show's female host.

Auditions
Auditions took place in the following islands:

Contestants

Season overview

Top 16 – Piano Round 
The Piano Round took place over two weeks, consisting of eight contestants per week. Mohamed Abdul Ghanee served as the contestants' mentor. Performance of the first eight contestants from Piano Round was aired on 2 March 2018 while elimination was held on 3 March 2018. Performance of the last eight contestants from Piano Round was aired on 9 March 2018 while elimination was proceeded on 10 March 2018.

Top 12 – Evergreen Hits 
The performances of the participants were aired on 16 March 2018, while the elimination night was held on 17 March 2018.

Top 10 – Acoustic Night 
The performances of the participants were aired on 23 March 2018, followed by the elimination on 24 March 2018.

Top 9 – Golden Artist 
The performances of the participants were aired on 30 March 2018, followed by the elimination on 31 March 2018.

Top 8 – Judges Choice 
The performances of the participants were aired on 6 April 2018, followed by the elimination on 7 March 2018.

Guest performances

References 

2018 television seasons